The Quiet Room is a 1996 Australian drama film directed by Rolf de Heer. It competed for the Palme d'Or at the 1996 Cannes Film Festival.

Plot
The Quiet Room centers on an unnamed little girl and how she deals with her parents' crumbling marriage. The film focuses entirely on her point of view and although she is silent for most of the film, we constantly hear her thoughts, sometimes in a stream of consciousness barrage of voice-over. The little girl has chosen to become mute as a way to protest her parents' constant fighting. Her parents, more concerned with their own issues, believe their daughter is just going through a phase. The film shows how even very young children can be extremely cognizant of problems that are going on in their own homes even when their parents try hard to shield them from everything.

The girl learns other ways to communicate with her parents. Through her drawings, she expresses her desire of owning a dog and how she believes they will be happier as a family if they lived in the country instead of in their tiny apartment in the city. During flashbacks, we see when her parents were happy and still in love. The girl, perhaps intentionally as a way to cope, confuses tenses (thinking "I'm little now..." instead of "when I was little..."). But even then, she catches glimpses of her parents' dysfunctional relationship, such as when her father spits in her mother's face after she yells at him. Her parents don't notice she is in the room but the memory leaves a long-lasting impression on her. In the present, her anxiety manifests itself through waking nightmares where she imagines wild animals escaping from the zoo and coming to get her. At the end of the film, she hides herself in her parents' wardrobe to escape their bickering. After a while, she falls asleep in an uncomfortable position. When she wakes up, she is too stiff to move. Unable to escape on her own, the little girl finally breaks down and calls out for help and her parents, who had thought she ran away, rush to her aid.

The girl gives her parents one last drawing. In it, she successfully conveys her feelings of being overwhelmed by her parents' constant fighting and how she feels less motivated to speak the more she hears them argue. As she hands it to them, she says, "This is how I feel. That's how you make me feel." Finally hearing their daughter for the first time and realizing the effect their behaviour has on hers, her parents announce that they're going to move to the country. When they also promise her a dog, she becomes so ecstatic that she starts singing incessantly and dancing around her room.

Cast
 Celine O'Leary as Mother
 Paul Blackwell as Father
 Chloe Ferguson as Girl Age 7
 Phoebe Ferguson as Girl Age 3
 Kate Greetham as Kate, the Babysitter
 Todd Telford as Workman
 Peter Ferris as Carpet Cleaner
 Peter Green as Carpet Cleaner
 Trudy Talbot as Well Dressed Woman (uncredited)

Box office
The Quiet Room grossed $57,245 at the box office in Australia.

References

External links

The Quiet Room at Oz Movies

1996 films
1996 drama films
Australian drama films
1990s English-language films
Films directed by Rolf de Heer